Arizona's 20th Legislative District is one of 30 in the state, situated in Maricopa County. As of 2021, there are 47 precincts in the district, with a total registered voter population of 139,377. The district has an overall population of 237,220.

Political representation
The district is represented for the 2021–2022 Legislative Session in the State Senate by Paul Boyer (R) and in the House of Representatives by Judy Schwiebert (D) and Shawnna Bolick (R).

See also
 List of Arizona Legislative Districts
 Arizona State Legislature

References

External links
  (Information based on U.S. Census Bureau's American Community Survey).
 
 

Maricopa County, Arizona
Arizona legislative districts